The West Milford Township Public Schools are a comprehensive community public school district that serves students in pre-kindergarten through twelfth grade from West Milford, in Passaic County, New Jersey, United States.

As of the 2018–19 school year, the district, comprising eight schools, had an enrollment of 3,309 students and 291.5 classroom teachers (on an FTE basis), for a student–teacher ratio of 11.4:1.

The district is classified by the New Jersey Department of Education as being in District Factor Group "FG", the fourth-highest of eight groupings. District Factor Groups organize districts statewide to allow comparison by common socioeconomic characteristics of the local districts. From lowest socioeconomic status to highest, the categories are A, B, CD, DE, FG, GH, I and J.

The district has six elementary schools (grades K-5), one middle school (grade 6-8), and one high school (grades 9-12), and also supports a Center for Adult/Community Education. The school system has 361 certified staff members, over 50% of whom have a master's degree or higher.

History
The old Newfoundland, two-room schoolhouse is now the Grasshopper Restaurant. The old Hillcrest School is now the township's community center.  The few one-room schoolhouses are all gone; the last one was the Hewitt School, destroyed by fire set by vandals (it had been the former Methodist church before a new, larger church was built).

Students from West Milford had attended Butler High School for grades 9-12 as part of a longstanding sending/receiving relationship that existed until September 1962, when West Milford opened its own high school. The Butler Public Schools had served students from large parts of Morris and Passaic counties, until soaring local enrollment led the district to notify feeder communities in 1954 that they would have to find alternative education options for their high school students.

Awards and recognition
NAMM named the district in its 2009 survey of the "Best Communities for Music Education", which included 124 school districts nationwide.

The district was selected as one of the top "100 Best Communities for Music Education in America 2005" by the American Music Conference.

Schools
Schools in the district (with 2018–19 enrollment data from the National Center for Education Statistics) are:
Elementary schools
Apshawa Elementary School (244 students in grades K-5)
Dr. Elissa Scillieri, Principal
Maple Road Elementary School (299; PreK-5)
William Kane, Principal
Marshall Hill Elementary School (271; K-5)
Patrick O'Donnell, Principal
Paradise Knoll Elementary School (273; K-5)
Jennifer Miller, Principal
Upper Greenwood Lake Elementary School (308; PreK-5)
Dr. Gregory Matlosz, Principal
Westbrook Elementary School (301; K-5)
Dr. Dana Swarts, Principal
Middle school
Macopin Middle School (533; 6-8)
Marc Citro, Principal
High school
West Milford High School (1,040; 9-12)
Matthew Strianse, Principal

Administration
Core members of the district's administration are:
Dr. Alex Anemone, Superintendent of Schools
Barbara Francisco, Business Administrator / Board Secretary

Board of education
The district's board of education, with nine members, sets policy and oversees the fiscal and educational operation of the district through its administration. As a Type II school district, the board's trustees are elected directly by voters to serve three-year terms of office on a staggered basis, with three seats up for election each year held (since 2013) as part of the November general election. The board appoints a superintendent to oversee the day-to-day operation of the district.

References

External links
West Milford Township Public Schools

School Data for the West Milford Township Public Schools, National Center for Education Statistics

West Milford, New Jersey
New Jersey District Factor Group FG
School districts in Passaic County, New Jersey